The Bicentenary Medal of the Royal Society of Arts is awarded to "a person who, in a manner other than as an industrial designer, has applied art and design in great effect as instruments of civic innovation", as long as the winner is not already "bedecked with medals".  It was first awarded in 1954, on the bicentenary of the Royal Society of Arts, and continues to be awarded annually with exceptions in 2003, 2006 and 2012.

The Medal was instituted in 1954 to commemorate the founding of the RSA over two hundred years earlier, and has been awarded to a variety of individuals for their outstanding contributions to the advancement of design in industry and society.  In the RSA's current account of design, that contribution is interpreted as the most effective use of design to increase the resourcefulness of people and communities.

List of Bicentenary Medallists

The medal's recipients are:

1954 Sir Colin Anderson
1955 Sir Charles Tennyson
1956 Sir Walter Worboys
1957 Sir Ernest Goodale
1958 John Gloag
1959 Frank A Mercer
1960 J. Cleveland Belle
1961 Audrey Withers
1962 Sir Robin Darwin
1963 Sir Paul Reilly
1964 Anthony S. Heal
1965 Hans Juda
1966 G. Graham McK Hughes
1967 Harold Glover
1968 Marcus Brumwell
1969 Sir Duncan Oppenheim
1970 T.H.C. Worthington
1971 Sir James Richards
1972 Rosamind Julius and Leslie Julius
1973 James S. Cousins
1974 Geoffrey Dunn
1975 Viscount Eccles
1976 Jack Pritchard
1977 Brooke Crutchley
1979 Sir William Coldstream
1980 Viscount Caldecote
1981 Deryck Healey
1982 Sir Terence Conran
1983 David Maroni
1984 Rowley Atterbury
1985 Sir Kenneth Corfield
1986 John Butcher
1987 Fiona MacCarthy
1988 Peter Gorb
1989 Louis van Praag
1990 Sir Peter Parker
1991 Sir Norman Payne
1992 Jeremy Fry
1993 Marquess of Bute
1994 Helen Auty
1995 Sir John Egan
1996 Zeev Aram
1997 Margaret Harris
1998 Sir John Sorrell CBE
1999 Stuart Lipton
2000 Wally Olins
2001 Sir Christopher Frayling
2002 Lady Hamlyn
2003 not awarded
2004 Deyan Sudjic
2005 Sheridan Coakley
2006 not awarded
2007 Lord Puttnam
2008 Tom Bloxham
2009 Cameron Sinclair and Kate Stohr 
2010 David Constantine MBE 
2011 Ken Arnold
2012 not awarded
2013 Barry Quirk CBE (Video of the talk on design and public services)
2014 Susan Woodward
2015 Dr Andrea Siodmok (Video of the talk on design thinking in Government)
2016 not awarded
2017 Mary V. Mullin
2018 Deanna Van Buren
2019 not awarded
2020 not awarded
2021 Daniel Christian Wahl

See also
 Albert Medal
 Benjamin Franklin Medal

References

Awards established in 1954
Orders, decorations, and medals of the United Kingdom
Arts awards in the United Kingdom
Design awards
Royal Society of Arts
Lists of award winners
1954 establishments in the United Kingdom
British design